Rein Hanson (born 18 June 1948 Kirbla Parish, Lääne County) is an Estonian politician. He was a member of VII Riigikogu.

References

Living people
1948 births
Members of the Riigikogu, 1992–1995